This is a list of people elected Fellow of the Royal Society in 1925.

Fellows 

William Ringrose Gelston Atkins
Sir Charles Arthur Lovatt Evans
Sir Ralph Howard Fowler
Francis Arthur Freeth
Walcot Gibson
Sir Harold Jeffreys
Frederic Wood Jones
James Kenner
Sir Edward Mellanby
James Alexander Murray
Joseph Proudman
Sir Richard Vynne Southwell
Leonard James Spencer
Robin John Tillyard
Richard Whiddington

1925
1925 in the United Kingdom
1925 in science